The saga of Hávarður of Ísafjörður (Icelandic: Hávarðar saga Ísfirðings) is one of the sagas of Icelanders. In its present form, the saga was probably written in the early 1300s.

It tells of Hávard (Hávarður), who had been a great Viking in his youth and was wounded in Scotland and has walked with a limp ever since. Hávard has a disagreement with his neighbor Thorbjørn and in the altercation, Hávard 's son Olafur  is killed.
Hávard seeks revenge and with a group of men attempts to confront Thorbjørn. Instead of facing Hávard, Thorbjørn flees into the sea and swims away, but Hávard  gives chase. Thorbjørn climbs up on a small island or rock formation and picks up a large rock to hurl at Hávard, who is climbing up after him. Then, Hávard is said to have thought of a different faith he had heard of when he was young abroad and swears that he will take this faith if he manages to survive. Thorbjørn then drops the slippery rock on himself and Hávard easily slays him.

References

Other sources
 Durrenberger, E. Paul and Dorothy (1996) The saga of Hávarður of Ísafjörður (Middlesex : Hisarlik Press)

External links
Proverbs in Hávarðar saga Ísfirðings
Full text and translations into many languages at the Icelandic Saga Database

Sagas of Icelanders